Jellejetta "Jetta" Klijnsma (born 18 March 1957) is a Dutch politician serving as the King's Commissioner of Drenthe since 2017. She is a member of the Labour Party (PvdA).

Elected to the House of Representatives from 2010 to 2012, she focused on matters of culture, senior citizens, disabled people and medical ethics. Previously she was State Secretary for Social Affairs and Employment under the Fourth Balkenende cabinet (2008–2010) and an alderwoman of the municipality of The Hague (1998–2008). From 2012 to 2017 she was appointed again as State Secretary for Social Affairs and Employment, dealing with the matters of unemployment insurances, pay equality, long-term unemployment, poverty, health and safety at work under the Second Rutte cabinet.

Early life
Klijnsma was born 18 March 1957 in Hoogeveen. She studied history at the University of Groningen, with a specialization in social history and economic history. After graduating she began to work for the Labour Party's parliamentary group. She was assistant to MPs André van der Louw, Marcel van Dam and Thijs Wöltgens.

Klijnsma has a physical handicap. She was born with spastic legs and only learned how to walk at age thirteen. She has a Reformed background but turned non-religious and became a member of the Dutch Humanist League.

Political career
In 1990 she was elected to the municipal council of The Hague. In 1998 she became alderwoman for welfare, health and emancipation. After the 2006 municipal elections she became responsible for culture and finance and also became vice-mayor. After Wim Deetman stepped down, she was mayor ad interim of The Hague and so became the first woman in that function.

In December 2008 she succeeded fellow Labour Party politician Ahmed Aboutaleb as State Secretary for Social Affairs and Employment in the Fourth Balkenende cabinet. She was State Secretary until February 2010, when the Labour Party withdrew its support for Balkenende's government. An MP from 2010 to 2012, she was appointed again as Social Affairs State Secretary in the Second Rutte cabinet in November 2012, serving until the inauguration on 26 October 2017 of the Third Rutte cabinet which the PvdA does not support. On 1 November 2017 she was appointed King's Commissioner of the province of Drenthe after former The Hague Mayor Jozias van Aartsen was appointed in March 2017 as Acting Commissioner; she took office on 1 December.

Decorations

References

External links

Official
  Drs. J. (Jetta) Klijnsma Parlement & Politiek

1957 births
Living people
Aldermen of The Hague
Dutch atheists
Dutch humanists
Dutch political consultants
Dutch politicians with disabilities
Economic historians
Former Calvinist and Reformed Christians
King's and Queen's Commissioners of Drenthe
Knights of the Order of Orange-Nassau
Labour Party (Netherlands) politicians
Mayors of The Hague
Members of the House of Representatives (Netherlands)
Municipal councillors of The Hague
People from Hoogeveen
People with cerebral palsy
Social historians
State Secretaries for Social Affairs of the Netherlands
University of Groningen alumni
Women mayors of places in the Netherlands
20th-century Dutch civil servants
20th-century Dutch women politicians
20th-century Dutch politicians
21st-century Dutch civil servants
21st-century Dutch women politicians
21st-century Dutch politicians
Women King's and Queen's Commissioners of the Netherlands